The Clearing Folk School, usually called just The Clearing, is a  continuing education institution located near Ellison Bay, Wisconsin, United States.  It was founded by Jens Jensen in 1935.  A successful landscape architect, Jensen began acquiring a private summer estate in 1919; the estate, re-landscaped by Jensen, became the nucleus of the school.  Jensen was inspired by the folk high schools of his native Denmark.

History
Jensen lived in The Clearing as a widower from 1935 until 1951.  After his death, The Clearing was operated by the Wisconsin Farm Bureau for 37 years as a rural retreat, conference center, and continuing-education institution.  Following The Clearing's independence as a nonprofit corporation in 1988, The Clearing has continued to fulfill these roles, with a concentration on adult education and as a meeting place for senior citizens.  The Clearing describes itself as a place for "classes in natural sciences, fine arts, skilled crafts and humanities."  The Clearing's emphasis on "regional ecology" is seen as providing continuity with founder Jensen's own aspirations and beliefs.

Current status
The appreciation of "regional ecology" from a landscape perspective, a focus of continuing education at The Clearing, has helped to drive the emerging professions of landscape ecology and spatial ecology.

As of 2012, the Clearing offers classwork throughout the year, except for March, April, and December.  Day-to-week-length appreciation classes center on collective learning through discussion, conversation, and hands-on work.  During the high season (May–October), the folk school specializes in weeklong appreciation classes; in November, January, and February, day classes and daylong workshops can be experienced.

The Clearing Folk School was added to the National Register of Historic Places on December 31, 1974 as site #74000080.

People connected with The Clearing
 Norbert Blei, longtime writer in residence
 Jens Jensen, founder

References

External links

"Jensen Will Open School of Nature" (continued) Door County Advocate, Volume 74, Number 14, June 14, 1935

Buildings and structures in Door County, Wisconsin
Historic American Landscapes Survey in Wisconsin
School buildings on the National Register of Historic Places in Wisconsin
National Register of Historic Places in Door County, Wisconsin
Education in Door County, Wisconsin